This list of Pittsburgh Panthers football All-Americans includes those members of the Pittsburgh Panthers football team who have received All-American honors from one or more selector organizations. The Pittsburgh Panthers, commonly referred to as the Pitt Panthers, represent the University of Pittsburgh in the sport of American football, and they compete in the Football Bowl Subdivision (FBS) of the National Collegiate Athletic Association (NCAA) and the Coastal Division of the Atlantic Coast Conference (ACC).

Several selector organizations release annual lists of their All-America teams after each college football season, honoring the best players at each position. Selector organizations include football analysts, television networks, publications, media wire services, sports writers' associations, and coaches' associations. Traditionally, several of the selectors have recognized two or more tiers of All-Americans, referred to as the first team, second team, third team and honorable mentions.

The NCAA currently recognizes the All-America teams of five selector organizations to determine "consensus All-Americans" and "unanimous All-Americans" in college football. The NCAA compiles consensus All-Americans using a point system based on the All-America teams from the five selector organizations. The point system consists of three points for a first-team selection, two points for a second-team selection, and one point for a third-team selection; no points are awarded for honorable mention selections. Since 1993, the NCAA-recognized selectors have included the American Football Coaches Association (AFCA), the Associated Press (AP), the Football Writers Association of America (FWAA), The Sporting News (SN), and the Walter Camp Football Foundation (WCFF), but the number of selectors used by the NCAA has varied over time, and has included different organizations in the past. The players receiving the most points at each position are recognized as consensus All-Americans; in order for a player to receive unanimous All-American recognition, he must be a first-team selection of all of the NCAA-recognized selector organizations.

Since the Pitt Panthers football team played its first season in 1890, at least 133 All-American selections have been bestowed on Pitt football players. 76 Panthers football players have received one or more selections as first-team All-Americans for a total of 92 all-time selections. Included among these players are 51 consensus All-Americans, which is the 12th most of any team. Of these, 14 were also unanimous All-Americans. The first Pitt player to be recognized as a first-team All-American was end J. Huber Wagner who was selected by Parke H. Davis, although Davis' selections are not listed in Pitt's Media Guide. Center Robert Peck, a three-time first team selection and member of the "Pop" Warner coached national championship teams of 1915 and 1916, was Pitt's first consensus All-American, a distinction that he earned twice. Peck, the first selection reported in Pitt's media guide, was elected into the College Football Hall of Fame following his playing days at the university.

All-time Pitt All-American selections

Key 

-1 = First Team Selection 
-2 = Second Team Selection
-3 = Third Team Selection
-4 = Fourth Team Selection

-t = tied for selection

[Defense] = selected for defensive team
[] other brackets following selectors indicated selections for alternate position if different from what is listed for each player (T=Tackle, HB=Halfback, FB=Fullback)

Selectors

AAB = The All-America Board; the Christy Walsh Syndicate asked an Inter-Sectional Board of Football Coaches originally made up of Tad Jones of Yale, Knute Rockne of Notre Dame and Glenn "Pop" Warner of Stanford to deliberate and select an All-American team
AFCA = American Football Coaches Association, first published in the Saturday Evening Post in 1945, were subsequently published in Collier's magazine between 1948 and 1956 as a replacement for Grantland Rice. AFCA selections since then have been published elsewhere under various sponsors.
Athlon = Athlon Sports Communications
AP = Associated Press based on a nationwide opinion poll of experts, including "newspaper sports editors and writers, Associated Press staff observers, officials and coaches in every section of the country."
BP = Boston Post, selected by Charles E. Parker, football expert of the Boston Post
BE = Billy Evans National Honor Roll, as culled from the selections of 200 sports editors
CBS = CBS Sports
CE = Collyer's Eye, selected by "sixty-seven nationally prominent football coaches, representing every major institution of learning, conference and district in the United States"
CFN = College Football News (Tom Harmon)
CH = College Humor magazine
CNS = Consensus team based on combined selections of the United Press, Associated Press, NEA News Service and the Collier's Weekly team by Grantland Rice
COL = Collier's Weekly, selected by Grantland Rice through 1947, sometimes with assistance from coaches such as Knute Rockne, Glenn Warner, Jesse Hawley, Fielding H. Yost, Robert Zuppke, Lou Young, Bill Roper, Wallace Wade, Dan McGugin and Clarence M. Price.
CP = Central Press Association, billed as the "Real" All-American team with selections based on fan input with cooperation from "hundreds of newspapers throughout the country"; later known as the Captain's Poll selected by a poll of the captains of the major football teams
CSW = College Sports Writers
DJW = Davis J. Walsh, sports editor of the International News Service
ESPN = ESPN
FM = Frank G. Menke, Sporting Editor of the International News Service
FN = Football News
FW = Football World magazine, based on collected opinions of 267 coaches
FWAA = Football Writers Association of America
HSM = All-American team selected by 18,006 fans through nationwide contest sponsored by clothier Hart, Schaffner and Marx
ID = Irving Dix
INS = International News Service (the wire service of the Hearst newspapers later merged with UP to form UPI), based on "popular vote among sport writers and coaches, representing every major section of the country"; voters included Damon Runyon, Ford Frick, Tom Thorp, Dick Hylund, John Heisman, and Bill Corum
JV = Jack Veiock, International News Service (INS) sports editor
LIB = Liberty magazine: "Fifteen hundred and forty Intercollegiate players from 93 major universities voted, according to Norman L. Sper who conducted the selection for Liberty"
LP = Lawrence Perry, a former Princetonian who wrote a nationally syndicated sports colyum called For The Game's Sake
MM = Malcolm McLean
MON = Monty, New York sports writer

MS = Frank Menke Syndicate, by Frank G. Menke (sporting editor King Features Syndicate)
NANA = North American Newspaper Alliance, originally selected by four noted coaches, Dan McGugin, Howard Jones, Bob Zuppke, and Bill Roper
NB = Norman E. Brown of the Central Press
NEA = Newspaper Enterprise Association, which stated "In the selection of these All-America players, the opinions of more than 100 coaches and football writers have been confidentially consulted", later, by the 33 members of the NEA Service National Board of Football Coaches, Officials and Sports Writers, and later by a committee of coaches; later selected by NEA sports editor Harry Grayson.
NYP = New York Post
NYS = The New York Sun
NYT = The New York Times
PD = Parke H. Davis, Princeton's representative on the football rules committee and noted football historian
PFW = Pro Football Weekly
PM = Philip Martin
PP = Paul Purman, noted sports writer whose All-American team was syndicated in newspapers across the United States
PS = Phil Steele
PW = Paul Williamson
Rivals = Rivals.com
RO = Romelke Press Clipping Bureau, based on votes of "nearly every important pressman who has picked an All-American team."
Scout = Scout.com
SH = Scripps-Howard
SI = Sports Illustrated
TC = Tommy Clark
Time = Time magazine
TM = Robert "Tiny" Maxwell, of the Philadelphia Public Ledger
TR = Ted A. Ramsay, an attempt to create a consensus All-American team using the selections of the six most prominent selectors: the All-America Board, NEA, UP, AP, New York Sun and New York World.
TSN = The Sporting News
TT = Tom Thorp, former captain of Columbia football team and head football coach at Fordham University in the New York Evening Journal
UP = United Press, originally as selected by United Press sports editor Frank Getty, with advice from "coaches and officials throughout the country" and later "named by the United Press with the assistance and advice of more than 200 coaches, officials and experts from every part of the country"
UPI = United Press International
USAT = USA Today
WC = Walter Camp, originally appearing in Collier's Weekly; following his death from the Walter Camp Football Foundation
WD = Walter Dobbins, a consensus based on the selections of Collier's, the United Press, the Associated Press, the All America Board, the New York Sun, the North America Newspaper Alliance, and Hearst
WE = Walter Eckersall, of the Chicago Tribune
WT = The Washington Times

Selections 

A list of football All-Americans at the University of Pittsburgh from all tiers and selectors follows. This list is assembled from historic, non-university sources but is likely incomplete, particularly for the list selectors for each individual. The University of Pittsburgh does not publish a list of All-Americans other than those that received first team honors, and that list can be found in the following section.

First Team selections
Pitt recognizes, per listing in its football media guide, 76 different players as having been selected as First Team All-American throughout its history for a total of 92 all-time First Team All-American Selections. That total includes 51 selections which have attained Consensus status per the NCAA official records book. Pitt's Consensus First Team selections ranks as the twelfth most consensus All-Americans among Division I FBS schools. The following list of Pitt's First Team All-Americans is compiled for the Pitt football media guide from various sources including the NCAA Football Guide, and consists of players who were first-team selections on one or more of the All American teams which were made over the years by Walter Camp, Grantland Rice, Caspar Whitney, International News Service, Associated Press, United Press International, NANA, NEA, the Football Writers Association of America, the Football Coaches Association, the All-America Board, Newsweek, The Sporting News, and Sports Illustrated.

Academic All-Americans
Pitt has had 15 different football players named as College Sports Information Directors of America Academic-All Americans for a total of 23 selections. In addition, five Pitt players have been named as a National Scholar-Athletes by the National Football Foundation and three players have awarded NCAA Postgraduate Scholarships.

See also 

List of Pittsburgh Panthers head football coaches
List of Pittsburgh Panthers football seasons
Pittsburgh Panthers

References

Bibliography 
 University of Pittsburgh Football Vault: The History of the Panthers. Sam Sciullo, Jr. Atlanta: Whitman Pulblishing, 2008, 
 University of Pittsburgh Football Media Guide 2008. E.J. Borghetti, Mendy Nestor, and Celeste Welsch eds. Pittsburgh: University of Pittsburgh, 2008
 Greatest Moments in Pitt Football History. Mike Bynum, Larry Eldridge, Jr., and Sam Sciullo, Jr. eds. Nashville, Tennessee: Athlon Sports Communications, 1994, 
 Hail to Pitt: A Sports History of the University of Pittsburgh. Jim O'Brien, ed. and Marty Wolfson, illus. Pittsburgh; Wolfson Publishing Co., 1982, 
 Pitt Stadium Memories 1925–1999. Sam Sciullo, Jr. Pittsburgh: University of Pittsburgh. 2000
 Tales from the Pitt Panthers. Sam Sciullo, Jr. Champaign, Illinois: Sports Publishing LLC, 2004, 
 The Year the Panthers Roared. Francis J. Fitzgerald, ed., Louisville, Kentucky, AdCraft Sports, 1996,

External links
 "Pitt Football's All-Time First Team All-Americans" at Official website of the Pitt Panthers

Lists of college football All-Americans

Pittsburgh Panthers football All-Americans